Andover High School (formerly Punchard High School, The School at Punchard, or Punchard Free School) is a secondary school in the town of Andover, Massachusetts, United States. It is the only public high school in the Andover Public Schools district. The school's administration is headed by Caitlyn Brown, the principal, and is overseen by Superintendent of Schools Magda Parvey

Campus

Overview 
As of June 2020, The Andover High School campus comprises one central academic facility, housing several classrooms, laboratories, health center and administrative offices. Connected to its northwest side is the J. Everett Collins Center for the Performing Arts, an auditorium that seats 1,203 people and is used for both school and town functions. To the southeast, two indoor athletic facilities abut the academic center (the Dunn Gymnasium and the Field House) alongside central locker rooms and athletic offices and storage. The school has a media center/library located in the center of the school and a cafeteria located toward the north-west side of the school, just south of the Collins Center.

Outdoor athletic fields 
Andover's campus contains 4 fields (Northeast, Northwest, Southeast and Southwest) and 1 stadium for athletic use. The northeast and northwest fields are divided by the main artery roadway off of Shawsheen road. The northwest field contains 1 baseball diamond and dugouts respectively. The south-most portion of the northwest field contains a hill, disqualifying that portion of the field from most athletic uses, however, is commonly used for sledding in the winter seasons.  The northeast and southeast fields are generally flat and each contain baseball and softball diamonds respectively. The southwest field is the smallest, by area, and is primarily used only by the physical education classes for outdoor activity.

Immediately northeast of the Dunn Gymnasium, there are accommodations for up to seven tennis matches.

The Eugene V. Lovely Memorial Field is Andover's outdoor football stadium. It was formerly used for the high school's commencement but was then abandoned due to size limitations as the school's population rose. The stadium is primarily used by Andover's football team, the Golden Warriors. In addition to bleachers and a turf field, there is a 400 meter track, and accommodations for field activities for track-and-field teams. Along the east side of the field, there are locker room facilities, along with a building used for the sales of concessions. The Eugene V. Lovely field is located to the far south of the school's campus, and abuts the parking lot off of Red Spring road.

Parking 
The Andover High School campus facilitates parking and traffic patterns for students and faculty. To the far north, immediately adjacent to Shawsheen Road, a portion of the West Middle School parking lot is allocated for student parking. Additional student allocations include a lot immediately north of the tennis courts, along Moraine Street, and in the parking lot to the south of the Eugene V. Lovely field, abutting Red Spring Road. Faculty parking is accommodated in lots adjacent to the J. Everett Collins Center and to the south of the field house.

Andover Youth Services Skate Park 
The Town Of Andover's Youth Services manages a skate park at the east side of the school's campus. According to their website, "since 1998, the Andover Community Skate Park has given people of all ages the opportunity to enjoy a dynamic atmosphere, fueled by creativity, dedication and passion. The Youth Services and the Skate Park staff are committed to ensuring a safe and positive environment for people of all ages and abilities."

Plans for renovation 
Since October 2018, the Andover School Committee has held sub-committee meetings regarding the state of facilities at the High School. Citing overcrowding and outdated facilities, the town sought monetary allocations from the Massachusetts School Building Authority (MSBA), however, have been repeatedly denied. Andover residents approved article 18 at the 2022 annual town meeting, which appropriated $1.5 million to infrastructure repairs at the high school. As of May 2022, discussions toward future renovations are ongoing.

Student life
Andover High School offers a variety of activities for students.

Sports are also offered at Andover High School for both men and women. Offered year round, the sports vary from Track and Field to Swimming and Diving as well as Volleyball and much more.  The teams compete in the Merrimack Valley Conference. The teams, whose mascot is a golden eagle, are styled as the Golden Warriors.

The Andover boys' basketball team received press in November 2011 for a sexually explicit soggy biscuit hazing scandal.

Performing arts programs, including a drama guild, show choir, other vocal ensembles, marching band and orchestra are facilitated in the J. Everett Collins Center for the Performing Arts.

Demographics

Notable alumni
 Michael Chiklis, actor
 Jay Leno, comedian and longtime host of NBC's The Tonight Show
 Arthur T. Demoulas, CEO of DeMoulas Market Basket
 Rob Oppenheim, professional golfer
 Briga Heelan, actress
 Martin Johnson (musician), former lead singer of Boys Like Girls
 Ryan Hanigan, professional baseball player
 Buddy Farnham, former New England Patriots wide receiver
 E. J. Perry (American football), former Brown Bears football, quarterback for the Jacksonville Jaguars
 Jesse Gallagher, vocals, musician of Apollo Sunshine
 Sid Watson, former NFL player and hockey coach
 Jacob Bannon, musician and artist, vocalist in metalcore band Converge
 Joe Sirois, musician, drummer in the ska punk band The Mighty Mighty Bosstones
 Blanchard Ryan, actress
Kara Hayward, actress best known for the movie Moonrise Kingdom

References

External links

Merrimack Valley Conference
Buildings and structures in Andover, Massachusetts
Schools in Essex County, Massachusetts
Public high schools in Massachusetts